Small Smart Weapon or Scorpion missile is a new generation small American missile manufactured by Lockheed Martin. It was used by CIA in drone attacks in Pakistan in an effort to minimize collateral damage. The Scorpion was a candidate to arm the U.S. Marine Corps' KC-130J Harvest Hawk, but the GBU-44/B Viper Strike bomb and AGM-176 Griffin missile were selected instead.

See also
Small Diameter Bomb
FASTLIGHT

References

External links
Small Smart Weapon information brochure, Lockheed Martin

Air-to-surface missiles of the United States